Chimaji Balaji Bhat was born in a Chitpavan Brahmin family in 1707 and died in 1740. He is commonly referred to as Appa or Bhau and was the son of Balaji Vishwanath Bhat and the younger brother of Bajirao Peshwa of Maratha Empire. He was an able military commander who liberated the western coast of India from Portuguese rule. The high watermark of his career was the capture of Vasai fort from the Portuguese in a hard-fought battle. He was known to run strategy for the Maratha Empire and was known to plan all the battles for Bajirao.

Maratha campaigns against the Portuguese

Chimaji Appa concentrated his energies towards the Western Ghats. Vasai (formerly known as Bassein) was the ultimate objective of the war, as this was the capital of the provincial government of Portugal's northern Indian

Capture of Belapur Castle
In 1733, the Marathas, led by Chimaji Appa, with Sardar Shankarbuwa Shinde wrested control of the Belapur Fort from the Portuguese. Sardar Janojirao Shinde actual Great grandfather of Ranojirao Shinde and real younger brother of Dattajirao Shinde [The First] (Scindia) opened the attack from maratha side. He had made a vow that if it were to be successfully recaptured from the Portuguese, he would place a garland of beli leaves in a nearby Amruthaishwar temple, and after the victory the fort was renamed as Belapur Fort.

The capture of Vasai

After careful planning, Chimaji Appa led Maratha armies into the occupied territories in 1737. Chimaji's strategy was to go for the weakest link in the chain to the strongest, thereby progressively weakening the Portuguese.

On 28 March 1737, Maratha forces led by Ranojirao Shinde and Shankarbuwa Shinde captured the strategic island fortress of Arnala, thus cutting off a crucial relief line to Vasai. Thane and Salsette Island were freed in 1737.

In November 1738, Chimaji Appa captured the fort of Dahanu and on 20 January 1739, Mahim capitulated. This was speedily followed by the capture of the forts of Kelve/Mahim by Chengojirao shinde, Sirgão – by Ranojirao shinde, Tarapur – by Janojirao shinde, and Asserim on 13 February 1739 by Chimnajirao Peshwa self. On 28 March 1739 Portuguese lost the island and the fortress of Karanja to Raoloji Shinde's forces.

Finally in February 1739, Chimaji Appa invaded Bassein Fort. He first occupied Versova fort., Dharavi and blockaded Bassein Creek. Then mines were laid at various points under the fort walls and detonated, causing a breach in the wall. As the Marathas including Ranojirao Shinde and his cousin grandfather Janojirao son of Shrimanat Changojirao poured into the fortress, the Portuguese fought on desperately and viciously, using their technically advanced weapons and artillery, they caused high casualties among the Marathas. Inch by inch the fort was secured and resistance contained in small pockets. At this stage the tower of Saint Sebastian collapsed in an explosion, and Portuguese morale plummeted.

All resistance ceased immediately. On 16 May the Portuguese army surrendered. Portuguese Captain Caetano de Souza Pereira signed the surrender as most of the top army officers were already dead.

Chimaji was magnanimous in victory, and surviving Portuguese were given a safe passage from the city. Portuguese were given eight days to take all their movable property and move out. Accordingly, the last remnants of Portuguese army and administration pulled out of Vasai by 23 May 1739.

Great Maratha warrior Manajirao, alias Jankoji Shinde, son of Chengojirao Shinde (and father of Ranoji), killed Portuguese top official General Martinho da Sylveira, General Pedro de Mello and Lt. Colonel João Malhão. The Portuguese sources record that during the entire war with Chimaji Appa during 1737–1740, besides the Northern Province's capital Baçaim (Portuguese name for Vasai), they further lost eight cities, four chief ports, twenty fortress, two fortified hills and 340 villages. The losses amounted to nearly the whole of the Northern Provinces.

To celebrate his victory and to fulfill a vow taken in front of Devi Vajreshwari, Chimaji appa had a temple built for the goddess nearby. The Vajreshwari Temple still stands there as a relic of Maratha glory. Chimaji Appa collected five large bells after he won in war against the Portuguese from Vasai Fort. He offered the bells at Bhimashankar, at Menavali near Wai in front of a Shiva Temple on the banks of the Krishna river, Banshanker temple( Pune), Omkareshwar Temple ( Pune) and Ramlinga temple Shirur.

Chimaji Appa is a well known and highly respected figure within Vasai, Bhayandar, Virar, Thane and Navghar region. Konkani celebrate his victory even today on Gudi Padwa a Maharashtri new year. Appa's contribution to Agri history is carried forward through generations through classic Powada across Maharashtra. He founded and renamed many villages including Vasai now a suburb, Bhayandar now a suburb, Virar now a town, Navghar now a town, Murdha, Rai, Morva, Dongri, Gorai and many more.

Chimaji Appa died in 1740. The conquest of Bassein was long cherished by the Marathas as a matter of national pride and glory. A relationship built on trust and camaraderie between Bajirao and Chimaji was the key to the meteoric rise of the Marathas during Bajirao Peshwa's reign.

Family
Chimaji was married to Rakhmabai (Pethe family). Rakhmabai was loving wife of Chimaji appa . They had a son Sadashivrao known popularly as Sadashivrao Bhau who led the Maratha forces in the historic Third Battle of Panipat against Ahmad Shah Durrani. Rakhmabai died shortly after Sadashivrao's birth.

In popular culture 

In the 2015 drama film Bajirao Mastani directed by Sanjay Leela Bhansali, Chimaji Appa was portrayed by Vaibhav Tatwawadi
In the popular historical drama Peshwa Bajirao, which has been telecasted on Sony TV from 23 January 2017, the character of Chimaji Appa has been portrayed by the young child artist Ayaan Zubair Rehmani and the elder version is being played by actor Saurabh Gokhale.

Legacy 
The ground in Vasai, a suburb of Mumbai, is named after him. The name of Ground is Chimaji Appa Kridangan.
A memorial has been built near the Vasai Fort containing a statue of Chimaji Appa along with a garden .

External links

The history of Vasai

People of the Maratha Empire
Peshwa dynasty
Marathi people
History of Vasai
1707 births
1740 deaths
History of Thane district

Chimaji Appasaheb Peshwa: The Slayer of Portuguese Regime Book by Prakash Harischandra